Kayapınar is a village in the District of Tufanbeyli, Adana Province, Turkey. As of 2011 it had a population of 79 people.

References

Villages in Tufanbeyli District